Selwyn Zadock Bowman (May 11, 1840 – September 30, 1928) was an American attorney and politician who served  in several public offices including that of U.S. Representative from Massachusetts.

Bowman was born in Charlestown, Massachusetts, to Zadock and Rosetta (Crane) Bowman. He attended the Charlestown public schools and Charlestown High School. He moved to Somerville, Massachusetts, with his parents in 1856.

He graduated from Harvard University in 1860 and from its law school in 1863.
He was admitted to the bar in 1863 and commenced practice in Boston, Massachusetts, and continued his residence in Somerville.

He served as a member of the State house of representatives in 1870, 1871, and again in 1875. He served as city solicitor of Somerville, Massachusetts, in 1872 and 1873. He served in the State senate in 1876 and 1877.

Bowman was elected as a Republican to the Forty-sixth and Forty-seventh Congresses (March 4, 1879 – March 3, 1883). He was an unsuccessful candidate for reelection in 1882 to the Forty-eighth Congress.

He returned to Somerville, and resumed the practice of law in Boston. He again served as city solicitor of Somerville from 1888 to 1897. He moved to Cohasset in 1914, and continued the practice of law in Boston.

Bowman died in Framingham, Massachusetts, on September 30, 1928. He was interred in Mount Auburn Cemetery in Cambridge.

See also
 1875 Massachusetts legislature
 1876 Massachusetts legislature
 1877 Massachusetts legislature

References

  Headley, Phineas Camp: Public men of to-day: being biographies of the President and Vice-President of the United States, each member of the Cabinet, the United States Senators and the members of the House of Representatives of the Forty-Seventh Congress, the Chief Justice and justices of the Supreme Court of the United States, and of the Governors of the Several States., pages 293-294, (1882).

External links
 

1840 births
1928 deaths
Harvard Law School alumni
Republican Party members of the Massachusetts House of Representatives
Republican Party Massachusetts state senators
Burials at Mount Auburn Cemetery
Republican Party members of the United States House of Representatives from Massachusetts